Turopolje is a region in Croatia situated between the capital city Zagreb and Sisak. The administrative center of the region Turopolje is the town of Velika Gorica.

Geography 
Turopolje forms a part of Posavina, a region to the south of Zagreb bordering the right banks of the Sava river on the east, and the Vukomericke Gorice hills to the southwest. It extends across an alluvial plain 45 km in length and up to 23 km in width.  The area of the region occupies an area of about 600 km2, with an average elevation of 110 m above sea level. Turopolje is divided into two halves by the river Odra and its tributary Lomnica.

Etymology 
The name Turopolje stems from the Croatian and Old Slavic word Tur, i.e. aurochs (Bos primigenius), a type of wild cattle present in the area during the Middle Ages.

History
Velika Gorica is the largest settlement and is first mentioned as Gorica in 1228. Other settlements include Mraclin (since prehistoric times), Staro Čiče (Bronze Age), Šćitarjevo (Roman empire), Lukavec (defense castle dating to the 15th century), Lekenik, Vukojevac, Peščenica, Buševec, Ogulinec, Vukovina, Poljana Lekenička and Brežana Lekenička.

The village of Vukojevac is currently in the middle of an environmental battle in order to reroute the proposed highway between Zagreb and Sisak.

Culture 
There is a pig breed from the region named the Turopolje pig which is very delicious.

Sources
 Turopolje at enciklopedija.hr 

Geography of Zagreb
Regions of Croatia
Geography of Zagreb County
Geography of Sisak-Moslavina County